For Keeps is a 1988 American coming of age comedy drama film starring Molly Ringwald and Randall Batinkoff as Darcy and Stan, two high school seniors in love. Complications ensue when Darcy becomes pregnant just before graduation and decides to keep her baby. This movie is noted for being Ringwald's final "teen" movie, and is cited as one of her most mature performances, particularly in a scene where Darcy is suffering from postpartum depression after the birth of her child.

Plot
In Kenosha, Wisconsin, Darcy, editor at her high school paper, and her steady boyfriend Stan are in their final year of high school and already have been accepted at good colleges. Before Darcy goes to the University of Wisconsin to study journalism, she will go on a trip to Paris with her mother for her graduation present, while Stan will go to Caltech to study architecture. With the help of Darcy's best friend Lila, Darcy and Stan spend a weekend together and Darcy becomes pregnant. They announce the pregnancy to their families at Thanksgiving.  Neither Darcy's single-parent mother Donna nor Stan's Catholic parents are very supportive. Respectively, they urge the young couple to have an abortion or give up the baby for adoption. Darcy plans to have an abortion, but does not go through with it, much to Stan's relief.

At Christmas, the couple announces their plans to keep the baby, causing a break between them and their parents. They rent a decrepit apartment and marry to the cheers of their friends, despite the fact that without parental consent the marriage is not legal. At the urging of her high school guidance counselor, who explains that other girls will want to emulate her and become adolescent mothers themselves, Darcy drops out of high school but works toward her GED. Prom is interrupted by Darcy's water breaking. Although baby Thea (short for Theodosia) is healthy, Darcy suffers from post-partum depression, unable to even hold her daughter, and Stan struggles to pay the bills on a part-time job salary. Only when Darcy hears an intruder (who turns out to be Stan's father) and picks up her baby protectively does she break from her depression.

Without telling Darcy, Stan sacrifices his Caltech scholarship because there is no married housing at the school for undergraduates. Stan and Darcy’s relationship starts to crumble with fights. Although Stan takes a second dead-end job, the bills pile up, and the couple finally moves in with Donna, which alienates Stan and Darcy, and causes Stan to drink heavily. Local neighborhood girl Michaela informs Darcy of the scholarship deception so she enlists Stan's best friend Chris in a plan to ensure he takes the scholarship and go to college after all. The plan entails throwing Stan out and annulling the marriage. Stan has a bad reaction to the news and later in the night goes into a rage outside their house. Stan reconciles with his parents, but is heartbroken over the split with Darcy, who does not change her mind but becomes visibly angry at her mother's cold attitude.

At Darcy's night school graduation, Stan arrives to inform Darcy that he has applied for scholarships to the University of Wisconsin–Madison for them both. Darcy lets slip her role in the Caltech deception with Chris, and Stan chases after her as she drives away. Darcy finally tells Donna that Stan is a good man, that she loves him and Donna can either embrace them as an entire family or watch them live their lives without her. Donna finally lets go of her hurt over the abandonment of Darcy's father and informs Stan about her daughter when he seeks her out. They reconcile at the school, intending to go forward with their plans to attend college in Madison in the fall as well as setting a curfew for Thea.

Cast

Production

Filming
The film is set in Kenosha, Wisconsin and was partially filmed there. Primary location work took place in Winnipeg, Manitoba, Canada.

The film had a number of titles while in production, possibilities including "Maybe, Baby" (by which it is known in some overseas territories) and "For Keeps?", before settling on the final question mark-less version.

John Zarchen suffered a life-threatening head injury while driving in Hollywood. He survived a brief period of being comatose and actually returned to the film, although director John Avildsen, due to his medical absence, reduced his role. This movie also marks the debut film appearance of Alex Trebek as himself, as well as of Pauly Shore, who appears in a small role as another friend of Stan.

The musical score features a lullaby-like version of the song "Be My Baby".

Casting
Actor Adam Silbar was originally cast in the lead role of Stan but, for unknown reasons, the role was later re-cast with Randall Batinkoff just weeks before the first day of production. Author and casting director Paul G. Bens, Jr., then an actor, was one of the two finalists to replace Silbar.  The role ultimately went to Batinkoff.

Release

Box office
In January 1988, the film debuted at #4 at the box office (behind Good Morning, Vietnam, Three Men and a Baby, and Moonstruck). It ultimately grossed $17,514,553 domestically.

Critical reception
On review aggregate website Rotten Tomatoes, For Keeps has an approval rating of 17% based on 12 reviews. Roger Ebert gave the film a positive review saying, "The movies of Molly Ringwald have been responsible for a revolution in the way Hollywood regards teenagers. Before Ringwald (and her mentor, John Hughes) there were only horny teenagers, dead teenagers, teenage vampires and psychotic crackups. Now teenage movies are working their way through some of the aspects of the normal life of American teenagers, and in For Keeps,' Ringwald plays a popular high school senior who gets pregnant and gets married."

Janet Maslin of The New York Times said, "Most of For Keeps is entirely predictable, but that should do little to diminish its interest for audiences of high-school age. Here again, Miss Ringwald is the very model of teen-age verisimilitude, and she's most impressive in making even the most hackneyed situations seem real. In fact, she's so good she's almost a problem. Mr. Batinkoff, while pleasant, is no real match for her, and the glowering parents who make their kids' lives miserable for a time are no real threat. There is the feeling that Miss Ringwald's Darcy can triumph over anything. But perhaps that's just what Mr. Avildsen had in mind."

Brian Pope of DVD Verdict gave a positive review, saying, "Pretty but approachable, smart but funny, cool but sweet, Ringwald represented everything most high-school girls wanted to be: the girl next door who always got the guy without compromising her values. Small wonder she is still regarded as an icon of 1980s teen cinema. It wasn't until Ringwald began dipping her toes into slightly more adult roles that she lost her footing. Take 'For Keeps', for instance. This movie dared to suggest that even a popular honors student is capable of making wrong decisions that result in life-changing consequences. More crucially, Ringwald suggested to her fans that the qualities they found so endearing in her aren't always adequate substitutes for natural maturity. Perhaps that was a bitter pill for her fans to swallow, but it's not such a bad message, and, more than 15 years after its release, 'For Keeps  isn't such a bad movie."

David Nusair of Reel Film gave a more negative review saying, "For Keeps takes a potentially intriguing subject (two teenagers attempting to start their lives together) and piles on cliche after cliche, until it's about as compelling as an afterschool special."

Home media
On March 23, 2004, the film was released on DVD.

References

External links
 
 
 

1988 films
1980s teen comedy-drama films
1980s coming-of-age comedy-drama films
1980s high school films
American teen comedy-drama films
Films scored by Bill Conti
Films directed by John G. Avildsen
Films set in Wisconsin
Films shot in Winnipeg
American pregnancy films
Teenage pregnancy in film
Postpartum depression in film
TriStar Pictures films
1988 comedy films
1988 drama films
1980s pregnancy films
1980s English-language films
1980s American films